Already Gone is an album by Kristy Hanson released in 2007.

Track listing
"Comfort" (Hanson) – 2:14
"Swansong" (Hanson) – 3:20
"Already Gone" (Hanson) – 2:44
"Wake Up" (Hanson) – 3:17
"Careful" (Hanson) – 3:52
"It's Not Over" (Hanson) – 2:27
"Let Me Out of This House" (Hanson) – 3:14
"Who Can Say" (Hanson) – 2:39
"Peace of Mind" (Hanson) – 3:21
"Packed My Bags" (Hanson) – 2:15

Personnel
 Jay Bellerose - drums, percussion
 Mike Chiaburu - upright bass
 Ryan Freeland - recording engineer, mixing, organ on 10
 Kristy Hanson - vocals, acoustic guitar
 Gavin Lurssen - mastering engineer
 Patrick Warren - keyboards (1, 2, 4, 5)

References

2007 albums